Connacht or Connaught is a western province in Ireland.

Connacht or Connaught may also refer to:

Places
 Connaught Hill, a community park in Prince George, British Columbia
 Connaught National Army Cadet Summer Training Centre, in Ottawa, Ontario, Canada
 Connaught Village, a neighbourhood in central London
 Republic of Connacht, a short-lived republic located in Connacht province in 1798
 Rural Municipality of Connaught No. 457, a rural municipality in Saskatchewan, Canada
 Taman Connaught, a township in Kuala Lumpur, Malaysia
 Connaught Place (disambiguation), several places
 Connaught Park (disambiguation), several places
 Connaught, Ontario (disambiguation), several places in Ontario, Canada

Schools
 Connacht Ulster Technological University
 Connaught School for Girls, a secondary school in Leytonstone, England
 The Connaught School, the former name of Alderwood School in Aldershot, England

Buildings
 Connaught Armoury, a building in Edmonton, Alberta, Canada
 Connaught Barracks, an army installation at Dover, England
 Connaught Battery, harbour defences in Nova Scotia
 Connaught Bridge Power Station, a generating station in Selangor, Malaysia
 Connaught Building, a building in Ottawa
 Connaught Hall (disambiguation), two English university halls of residence
 Connaught Hospital, a hospital in Sierra Leone
 Connaught Rooms, hotel and conference centre in London, England
 Connaught Theatre, a former cinema in Worthing, England
 Old Connaught House, a house in Dublin
 Royal Connaught Hotel, a building in Hamilton, Ontario, Canada
 The Connaught (hotel), a five-star hotel in London, England
 The Connaught (Sydney), a landmark residential apartment building in Sydney, Australia

Streets
 Connaught Drive, a road in Singapore
 Connaught Place (disambiguation), a location in several cities
 Connaught Road on the north shore of Hong Kong Island
 Connaught Square, a square in Westminster, London
 Connaught Square, a square in Thunder Bay, Canada

Companies and corporations 
 Connaught Laboratories, a company now part of Sanofi Pasteur vaccines company
 Connaught Motor Company, a British manufacturer of high performance road cars
 Connaught plc, a UK company operating in the social housing, public sector and compliance markets

Sport
 Connaught (1965-1987), a thoroughbred racehorse trained in Britain
 Connaught Cup (disambiguation), several Canadian sporting competitions
 Connaught Engineering, a British Formula One and sports car constructor of the 1950s
 Connacht GAA, the provincial council governing Gaelic games in the Irish province
 Connaught Park Racetrack, a horse-racing track at Aylmer, Quebec
 Connacht Rugby, either the governing body for rugby union in the Irish province, or its senior team which competes in the Magners League
 Royal Connaught Boat Club, a watersports club in Pune, India

People
Prince Arthur, 1st Duke of Connaught and Strathearn (1850–1942), third son of Queen Victoria
Prince Arthur of Connaught (1883–1938), only son of the 1st Duke, predeceased his father
Alastair Windsor, 2nd Duke of Connaught and Strathearn (1914–1943), only child of Prince Arthur of Connaught, died unmarried and without issue

Transport
 Connaught, a mail and passenger steamship built in 1897, torpedoed in World War I
 Connaught Road railway station, a former east London station
 Connaught Tunnel, a railway tunnel in British Columbia
 Duke of Connaught, several steamships

Other uses
 Connacht, a major character in the Myth computer game series